The complete list of players drafted by the Ottawa Senators (1992–) of the National Hockey League (NHL) at the NHL Entry Draft. The Senators were approved as franchise partners of the NHL in December 1990, and participated in their first entry draft in 1992. That year, the team also participated in the 1992 NHL Expansion Draft.

First round picks

1992 Draft picks

Ottawa's draft picks at the 1992 NHL Entry Draft held on June 20, 1992, at the Montreal Forum in Montreal, Quebec.

1993 Draft picks

Ottawa's draft picks at the 1993 NHL Entry Draft held on June 26, 1993, at the Colisée de Québec in Quebec City, Quebec.

1994 Draft picks

Ottawa's draft picks at the 1994 NHL Entry Draft held on June 28 and 29, 1994, at the Hartford Civic Center in Hartford, Connecticut.

1995 Draft picks

Ottawa's draft picks at the 1995 NHL Entry Draft held on July 28, 1995, at Edmonton Coliseum in Edmonton, Alberta.

1996 Draft picks

Ottawa's draft picks from the 1996 NHL Entry Draft held on June 22, 1996, at the Kiel Center in St. Louis, Missouri.

1997 Draft picks

Ottawa's draft picks from the 1997 NHL Entry Draft held on June 21, 1997, at the Pittsburgh Civic Arena in Pittsburgh, Pennsylvania.

1998 Draft picks

Ottawa's draft picks from the 1998 NHL Entry Draft held on June 27, 1998, at the Marine Midland Arena in Buffalo, New York.

1999 Draft picks

Ottawa's draft picks from the 1999 NHL Entry Draft held on June 26, 1999, at the FleetCenter in Boston, Massachusetts.

2000 Draft picks

Ottawa's draft picks from the 2000 NHL Entry Draft held on June 24 and 25, 2000, at the Saddledome in Calgary, Alberta.

2001 Draft picks

Ottawa's draft picks from the 2001 NHL Entry Draft held on June 23 and 24, 2001, at the National Car Rental Center in Sunrise, Florida.

2002 Draft picks

Ottawa's draft picks from the 2002 NHL Entry Draft held on June 22 and 23, 2002, at the Air Canada Centre in Toronto, Ontario.

2003 Draft picks

Ottawa's draft picks from the 2003 NHL Entry Draft held on June 21 and 22, 2003, at the Gaylord Entertainment Center in Nashville, Tennessee.

2004 Draft picks

Ottawa's draft picks from the 2004 NHL Entry Draft held on June 26 and 27, 2004, at the RBC Center in Raleigh, North Carolina.

2005 Draft picks

Ottawa's draft picks from the 2005 NHL Entry Draft held on July 30, 2005, at the Westin Hotel in Ottawa, Ontario.

2006 Draft picks

Ottawa's draft picks from the 2006 NHL Entry Draft held on June 24, 2006, at General Motors Place in Vancouver, British Columbia.

2007 Draft picks

Ottawa's draft picks at the 2007 NHL Entry Draft held on June 22 and 23, 2007, at Nationwide Arena in Columbus, Ohio.

2008 Draft picks
Ottawa's picks at the 2008 NHL Entry Draft at Scotiabank Place in Ottawa, Ontario.

2009 Draft picks 

The 2009 NHL Entry Draft was held in Montreal, Quebec on June 26–27, 2009.  Ottawa made the following picks:

2009 Draft transactions
 The Columbus Blue Jackets' second-round pick went to the Senators as the result of a trade on March 4, 2009 that sent Antoine Vermette to Columbus in exchange for Pascal Leclaire and this pick.
 The Senators' third-round pick went to the Nashville Predators as the result of a trade on June 20, 2008, that sent a first-round pick in 2008 to Ottawa in exchange for a first-round pick in 2008 and this pick.
 The Boston Bruins' fifth-round pick went to the Senators as the result of a trade on June 25, 2008, that sent Brian McGrattan to the Phoenix Coyotes for this pick. Phoenix previously acquired this pick as the result of a trade on December 6, 2007, that sent Alex Auld to Boston for Nate DiCasmirro and this pick.
 The Edmonton Oilers' seventh-round pick went to the Senators as the result of a trade on June 27, 2009, that sent a sixth-round pick in 2010 to Edmonton in exchange for this pick.

2010 Draft picks 

The 2010 NHL Entry Draft was held in Los Angeles, California on June 25–26, 2010. Ottawa made the following picks:

2010 Draft transactions
 The  Senators' first-round pick went to the St. Louis Blues as the result of a trade on June 25, 2010 that sent David Rundblad to Ottawa in exchange for the pick, with which St. Louis chose Vladimir Tarasenko. 
 The Senators' second-round pick went to the Edmonton Oilers as the result of a trade on June 26, 2010 that sent the rights to Riley Nash to the Carolina Hurricanes in exchange for the pick, which Edmonton used to choose Martin Marincin. Carolina previously acquired the pick as the result of a trade on February 12, 2010 that sent Matt Cullen to Ottawa in exchange for Alexandre R. Picard and this pick. 
 The Senators' fifth-round pick went to the San Jose Sharks as the result of a trade on September 12, 2009 that sent Milan Michalek, Jonathan Cheechoo and a second-round pick in 2010 to Ottawa in exchange for Dany Heatley and this pick. The Senators traded the Sharks' second-round pick to the Islanders for Andy Sutton.

2011 Draft picks 

The 2011 NHL Entry Draft was held in Saint Paul, Minnesota, on June 24–25, 2011. The Senators decided to break up their team and start to rebuild. As a result of trading several veterans for draft picks, Ottawa had a total of ten draft picks. Ottawa had three in the first round after trading Mike Fisher to Nashville and trading two second-round picks to Detroit on draft day for their first-round pick. Ottawa made the following picks:

2012 Draft picks 

The 2012 NHL Entry Draft was held in Pittsburgh, Pennsylvania on June 22–23, 2012.  Ottawa made the following picks:

2013 Draft picks 

The 2013 NHL Entry Draft was held in Newark, New Jersey on June 30, 2013.  Ottawa made the following picks:

2012 Draft transactions
 The Ottawa Senators' second-round pick went to the St. Louis Blues as the result of a trade on February 26, 2012, that sent Ben Bishop to Ottawa in exchange for this pick.
 The Philadelphia Flyers' fourth-round pick went to the Ottawa Senators as the result of a trade on April 3, 2013, that sent Ben Bishop to Tampa Bay in exchange for Cory Conacher and this pick. Tampa Bay previously acquired this pick as the result of a trade on February 18, 2012 that sent Pavel Kubina to Philadelphia in exchange for a conditional second-round pick in either 2012 or 2013 and this pick.
 The Dallas Stars’ sixth-round pick went to the Ottawa Senators as the result of a trade on June 7, 2013, that sent Sergei Gonchar to Dallas in exchange for this pick (being conditional at the time of the trade). The condition – Ottawa will receive a sixth-round pick in 2013 if Gonchar signs with Dallas prior to the 2013 NHL Entry Draft – was converted on June 8, 2013.

2014 Draft picks 

The 2014 NHL Entry Draft was held in Philadelphia, Pennsylvania on June 27–28, 2014.  Ottawa made the following picks:

2014 Draft transactions
 The Ottawa Senators' first-round pick went to the Anaheim Ducks as the result of a trade on July 5, 2013, that sent Bobby Ryan to Ottawa in exchange for Jakob Silfverberg, Stefan Noesen and this pick.
 The Ottawa Senators' fifth-round pick went to the Edmonton Oilers as the result of a trade on March 5, 2014, that sent Ales Hemsky to Ottawa in exchange for a third-round pick in 2015 and this pick.
 The Ottawa Senators' sixth-round pick went to the Minnesota Wild as the result of a trade on March 12, 2013, that sent Matt Kassian to Ottawa in exchange for this pick.
 The Winnipeg Jets' seventh-round pick went to the Ottawa Senators as the result of a trade on June 28, 2014, that sent a sixth-round pick in 2015 to Winnipeg in exchange for this pick.

2015 Draft picks

The 2015 NHL Entry Draft was held in Sunrise, Florida on June 26–27, 2015. Ottawa made the following picks:

2015 Draft transactions
 The New York Islanders' first-round pick went to the Ottawa Senators as the result of a trade on June 26, 2015 that sent Robin Lehner and David Legwand to Buffalo in exchange for this pick. Buffalo previously acquired this pick as the result of a trade on October 27, 2013 that sent Thomas Vanek to New York in exchange for Matt Moulson, a second-round pick in 2015 and this pick (being conditional at the time of the trade). The condition – Buffalo will receive a first-round pick in 2014 or 2015 at New York's choice – was converted on May 22, 2014 when the Islanders elected to keep their 2014 first-round pick.
 The New Jersey Devils’ second-round pick went to the Ottawa Senators as the result of a trade on June 27, 2015 that sent Dallas’ second-round pick in 2015 (42nd overall) and a conditional fourth-round pick in 2015 or 2016 to New Jersey in exchange for this pick.
 The Ottawa Senators' third-round pick went to the New York Rangers as the result of a trade on June 27, 2015 that sent Cam Talbot and a seventh-round pick in 2015 (209th overall) to Edmonton in exchange for Montreal's second-round pick in 2015 (57th overall), a seventh-round pick in 2015 (184th overall) and this pick. Edmonton previously acquired this pick as the result of a trade on March 5, 2014 that sent Ales Hemsky to Ottawa in exchange for a fifth-round pick in 2014 and this pick.
 The Pittsburgh Penguins' fourth-round pick went to the Ottawa Senators as the result of a trade on June 27, 2015 that sent Eric Gryba to Edmonton in exchange for Travis Ewanyk and this pick.
 The Ottawa Senators' sixth-round pick went to the Carolina Hurricanes as the result of a trade on December 18, 2014 that sent Jay Harrison to Winnipeg in exchange for this pick. Winnipeg previously acquired this pick as the result of a trade on June 28, 2014 that sent a seventh-round pick in 2014 to Ottawa in exchange for this pick.

2016 Draft picks

The 2016 NHL Entry Draft was held in Buffalo, New York on June 24–25, 2016. Ottawa made the following picks:

2016 Draft transactions
 The New Jersey Devils' first-round pick (#11 overall) went to the Ottawa Senators as a result of trade that was made on June 25, 2016 that sent Ottawa's first-round pick (#12 overall) and a conditional 3rd-round pick (#80 overall) to the Devils.
 The Ottawa Senators' 7th-round pick went to the New York Islanders as part of a trade that saw Shane Prince being traded to the Islanders on February 29, 2016.

2017 Draft picks

The 2017 NHL Entry Draft was held in Chicago, Illinois on June 23–24, 2017. Ottawa made the following picks:

2017 Draft transactions
 The Calgary Flames' second-round pick (#47 overall) went to the Ottawa Senators as the result of a trade on March 1, 2017, that sent Curtis Lazar and Mike Kostka to Calgary in exchange for Jyrki Jokipakka and this pick.
 The Senators' second-round pick went the Toronto Maple Leafs as the result of a trade on February 9, 2016, that sent Dion Phaneuf, Matt Frattin, Casey Bailey, Ryan Rupert and Cody Donaghey to Ottawa in exchange for Milan Michalek, Jared Cowen, Colin Greening, Tobias Lindberg and this pick.
 The Senators' third-round pick went to the Chicago Blackhawks as the result of a trade on April 28, 2017, that sent Scott Darling to Carolina in exchange for this pick. Carolina previously acquired this pick as the result of a trade on February 28, 2017, that sent Viktor Stalberg to Ottawa in exchange for this pick.
 The Senators' fifth-round pick went to the Pittsburgh Penguins as the result of a trade on November 2, 2016, that Mike Condon to Ottawa exchange for this pick.
 The Senators' seventh-round pick went to the New Jersey Devils as the result of a trade on June 24, 2017, that sent Nashville's sixth-round pick in 2017 (185th overall) to San Jose in exchange for a seventh-round pick in 2017 (205th overall) and this pick. San Jose previously acquired this pick as the result of a trade on January 24, 2017, that sent Tommy Wingels to Ottawa in exchange for Buddy Robinson, Zack Stortini and this pick.

2018 Draft picks

The 2018 NHL Entry Draft was held in Dallas, Texas on June 22–23, 2018. Ottawa made the following picks:

2018 Draft transactions
 The Pittsburgh Penguins' first-round pick went to the Ottawa Senators as the result of a trade on February 23, 2018, that sent Derick Brassard and Ottawa's 2018 third-round pick to Pittsburgh in exchange for Ian Cole, Filip Gustavsson, Pittsburgh's third-round pick in 2019 and this pick.
 The Senators' second-round pick went to the New York Rangers as the result of a trade on July 18, 2016, that sent Derick Brassard and New York's seventh-round pick in 2018 to Ottawa in exchange for Mika Zibanejad and this pick.

2019 Draft picks

The 2019 NHL Entry Draft was held in Vancouver, British Columbia on June 21–22, 2019. Ottawa made the following picks:

2019 Draft transactions
  The Senators' first-round pick went to the Colorado Avalanche as the result of a trade on November 5, 2017 that sent Matt Duchene to Ottawa in exchange for Kyle Turris, Shane Bowers, Andrew Hammond, a third-round pick in 2019 and this pick (being conditional at the time of the trade). The condition – Colorado will receive a first-round pick in 2019 if the Senators' first-round pick in 2018 is inside the top ten selections and the Senators decide to defer the pick to 2019 – was converted on June 22, 2018.
  The Columbus Blue Jackets' first-round pick went to the Senators as the result of a trade on February 22, 2019 that sent Matt Duchene and Julius Bergman to Columbus in exchange for Vitalii Abramov, Jonathan Davidsson, a conditional first-round pick in 2020 and this pick (being conditional at the time of the trade). The condition – Ottawa will receive a first-round pick in 2019 if the Blue Jackets' first-round pick is outside of the top three selections in the 2019 NHL Entry Draft – was converted when the Blue Jackets clinched a spot in the 2019 Stanley Cup playoffs on April 5, 2019.
 The Florida Panthers' second-round pick went to the Senators as the result of a trade on September 13, 2018 that sent Erik Karlsson and Francis Perron to San Jose in exchange for Chris Tierney, Dylan DeMelo, Josh Norris, Rudolfs Balcers, a conditional first-round pick in 2019 or 2020, a conditional first-round pick in 2021, a conditional first-round pick no later than 2022 and this pick (being conditional at the time of the trade). The condition – Ottawa will receive the higher of Florida or San Jose's second-round pick in 2019. – was converted on March 26, 2019 when Florida was eliminated from the 2019 Stanley Cup playoffs ensuring that Florida would select higher than San Jose.
  The Senators' third-round pick went to the Colorado Avalanche as the result of a trade on November 5, 2017 that sent Matt Duchene to Ottawa in exchange for Kyle Turris, Shane Bowers, Andrew Hammond, a conditional first-round pick in 2018 and this pick.
  The Pittsburgh Penguins' third-round pick went to the Senators as the result of a trade on February 23, 2018 that sent Derick Brassard to Vegas in exchange for this pick.

2020 Draft picks

The 2020 NHL Entry Draft was held electronically on October 6-7, 2020. Ottawa made the following ten picks:

2020 Draft transactions 
 The San Jose Sharks' first-round pick went to the Senators as the result of a trade on September 13, 2018 that sent Erik Karlsson and Francis Perron to San Jose in exchange for Chris Tierney, Dylan DeMelo, Josh Norris, Rudolfs Balcers, a conditional second-round pick in 2019, a conditional first-round pick in 2021, a conditional first-round pick no later than 2022 and this pick (being conditional at the time of the trade). The condition – Ottawa will receive a first-round pick in 2020 if San Jose qualifies for the 2019 Stanley Cup playoffs – was converted on March 19, 2019.
 The New York Islanders' first-round pick went to the Senators as the result of a trade on February 24, 2020 that sent Jean-Gabriel Pageau to New York in exchange for a second-round pick in 2020, a conditional third-round pick in 2022 and this pick (being conditional at the time of the trade). The condition – Ottawa will receive a first-round pick in 2020 if New York's first-round pick is outside the top three selections – was converted when the Islanders advanced to the First Round of the 2020 Stanley Cup playoffs on August 7, 2020.
 The Toronto Maple Leafs' second-round pick went to the Senators as the result of a trade on October 7, 2020 that sent the Islanders' second-round pick and a third-round pick both in 2020 (59th and 64th overall) to Toronto in exchange for this pick.
 The Dallas Stars' second-round pick went to the Senators as the result of a trade on February 25, 2019 that sent Mark Stone and Tobias Lindberg to Vegas in exchange for Erik Brannstrom, Oscar Lindberg and this pick. Vegas previously acquired this pick as the result of a trade on June 26, 2017 that sent Marc Methot to Dallas in exchange for Dylan Ferguson and this pick.
 The Senators' third-round pick went to the Toronto Maple Leafs as the result of a trade on October 7, 2020 that sent a second-round pick in 2020 (44th overall) to Ottawa in exchange for the Islanders' second-round pick in 2020 (59th overall) and this pick.
 The Winnipeg Jets' third-round pick went to the Senators as the result of a trade on February 18, 2020 that sent Dylan DeMelo to Winnipeg in exchange for this pick.
 The Senators' fourth-round pick went to the Florida Panthers as the result of a trade on October 2, 2020 that sent Josh Brown to Ottawa in exchange for this pick.
 The Senators' fifth-round pick went to the Edmonton Oilers as the result of a trade on October 7, 2020 that sent a third-round pick in 2020 (76th overall) to San Jose in exchange for Buffalo's fourth-round pick in 2020 (100th overall) and this pick. San Jose previously acquired this pick as the result of a trade on June 19, 2018 that sent Mikkel Boedker, Julius Bergman and a sixth-round pick in 2020 to Ottawa in exchange for Mike Hoffman, Cody Donaghey and this pick.
 The Tampa Bay Lightning's fifth-round pick went to the Senators as the result of a trade on July 30, 2019 that sent Mike Condon and a sixth-round pick in 2020 to Tampa Bay in exchange for Ryan Callahan and this pick.
 The Senators' sixth-round pick went to the Tampa Bay Lightning as the result of a trade on July 30, 2019 that sent Ryan Callahan and a fifth-round pick in 2020 to Ottawa in exchange for Mike Condon and this pick.
 The San Jose Sharks' sixth-round pick went to the Senators as the result of a trade on June 19, 2018 that sent Mike Hoffman, Cody Donaghey and a fifth-round pick in 2020 to San Jose in exchange for Mikkel Boedker, Julius Bergman and this pick.
 The St. Louis Blues' sixth-round pick went to the Senators as the result of a trade on November 22, 2018 that sent Chris Wideman to Edmonton in exchange for this pick. Edmonton previously acquired this pick in a trade on October 1, 2018 that sent Jakub Jerabek to St. Louis in exchange for this pick (being conditional at the time of the trade). The condition – Edmonton will receive a sixth-round pick in 2020 if Jerabek plays in less than 50 games during the 2018–19 NHL season – was converted on December 22, 2018.
  The Senators' seventh-round pick went to the Chicago Blackhawks as the result of a trade on October 7, 2020 that sent Montreal's seventh-round pick in 2021 to Montreal in exchange for this pick. Montreal previously acquired this pick as the result of a trade on February 24, 2020 that sent Matthew Peca to Ottawa in exchange for Aaron Luchuk and this pick.

2021 Draft picks

The 2021 NHL Entry Draft was held electronically on July 23-24, 2021. Ottawa made the following picks:

2022 Draft picks

The 2022 NHL Entry Draft was held July 7–8, 2022 at the Bell Centre arena in Montreal, Quebec, Canada. The Senators traded their first-round pick and second-round pick to acquire Alex DeBrincat. The Senators' top pick was made in the second round - defenceman Filip Nordberg with the 64th-overall pick. The team had nine selections overall.

Transactions
 The Senators' first-round  and second-round picks went to the Chicago Blackhawks as the result of a trade on July 7, 2022, that sent Alex DeBrincat to Ottawa in exchange for a third-round pick in 2024 and these picks.
 The Tampa Bay Lightning's second-round pick went to the Senators as the result of a trade on December 27, 2020, that sent Marian Gaborik and Anders Nilsson to Tampa Bay in exchange for Braydon Coburn, Cedric Paquette and this pick.

 The Boston Bruins' third-round pick went to the Senators as the result of a trade on April 11, 2021, that sent Mike Reilly to Boston in exchange for this pick.

 The Winnipeg Jets' fifth-round pick went to the Senators as the result of a trade on March 21, 2022, that sent Zach Sanford to Winnipeg in exchange for this pick.
 The Boston Bruins' fifth-round pick went to the Senators as the result of a trade on March 21, 2022, that sent Josh Brown and a conditional seventh-round pick in 2022 to Boston in exchange for Zach Senyshyn and this pick.

 The Senators' seventh-round pick went to the Boston Bruins as the result of a trade on March 21, 2022, that sent Zach Senyshyn and a fifth-round pick in 2022 to Ottawa in exchange for Josh Brown and this pick (being conditional at the time of the trade). The condition – Boston will receive a seventh-round pick in 2022 if Senyshyn plays in fewer than five games for the Senators before the conclusion of the 2021–22 NHL season – was converted when it was no longer possible for Senyshyn to play in five games for Ottawa in the 2021–22 season on April 26, 2022.
 The New York Islanders' seventh-round pick went to the Ottawa Senators as the result of a trade on April 11, 2021, that sent Braydon Coburn to New York in exchange for this pick.

References

 
draft
Ottawa Senators